Philip Eisner is an American screenwriter best known for writing the screenplay for the 1997 science fiction/horror film Event Horizon, which was produced by Paramount and helmed by director Paul W. S. Anderson.

Screenplays
In addition to writing the film Event Horizon (1997), Eisner also wrote Firestarter: Rekindled for Sci Fi (now known as Syfy) which was produced in 2002.  In early 2005, Scott Rudin Productions acquired Eisner's supernatural thriller spec script Furious Angels.

Eisner also wrote the screenplay for The Mutant Chronicles, which was released in 2009 and stars Thomas Jane and John Malkovich. The film tells the tale of 28th century soldiers battling so-called "NecroMutants."

Eisner was the lead screenwriter for Sweet Girl released in 2021. The film is about a devastated husband who vows to bring justice to the people responsible for his wife's death while protecting the only family he has left, his daughter. The film stars Jason Momoa.

Comic book writing
Eisner writes the comic book Bad Guys which is coordinated by Kevin Spacey's TV/film production company Trigger Street Productions and Kickstart Comics.

Teaching
He also teaches several screenwriting courses at the UCLA extension.

References

External links

Year of birth missing (living people)
Living people
Screenwriters from California
American male screenwriters
Screenwriting instructors
University of California, Los Angeles faculty